Amorphoscelis lamottei is a species of praying mantis found in Ivory Coast, Ghana, Guinea, and in the Congo River area.

See also
List of mantis genera and species

References

Amorphoscelis
Mantodea of Africa
Insects described in 1963